Amy Buller (born 9 November 1891, London; died London 1974) was a British educator and author, known for her book, Darkness over Germany (1943).  She wrote about how Nazi policies ideologically manipulated young Germans.

Early years 

Amy Buller grew up in a Baptist family in South Africa. In 1911, she returned to England but visited Germany several times before the outbreak of the First World War. She studied history at Birkbeck College, receiving her degree in 1917.

She converted to Anglo-Catholicism and from 1921 worked as an employee for the Student Christian Movement of Great Britain (SCM), first in Manchester and from 1922 in London. Between 1929 and 1931 she was a member of the SCM executive committee.

Darkness over Germany (1943) 

She visited Germany regularly and organised visits by English clergy and teachers even after the rise of the National Socialist party. She saw the enthusiasm for National Socialism as being a sort of replacement religion. Her groups travelled widely around Germany in the pre-war years, visiting, for example, a labour camp. The London Ambassador Joachim von Ribbentrop had hoped to harness the British groups of visitors for propaganda purposes but in 1937 found this was not possible and obstructed further visits.

In the introduction to her book Darkness over Germany, she wrote: "I record these stories to emphasize the need for youth and those who plan the training of youth to consider carefully the full significance of the tragedy of a whole generation of German youth who, having no faith, made Nazism their religion."

After the war 

Buller planned to found a college that taught from a Christian perspective. She planned to set this up in the Catherine Foundation buildings in Regent's Park but this fell through. Eventually she was given the use of Cumberland Lodge in Windsor Park. In 1947 the foundation called The foundation of St. Catherine was created. She held the office of Warden until 1966.

References

1891 births
1974 deaths
20th-century English writers
20th-century English women writers
Alumni of Birkbeck, University of London
Writers from London